Chromodomain-helicase-DNA-binding protein 9 is an enzyme that in humans is encoded by the CHD9 gene.

Model organisms
Model organisms have been used in the study of CHD9 function. A conditional knockout mouse line called Chd9tm1a(EUCOMM)Wtsi was generated at the Wellcome Trust Sanger Institute. Male and female animals underwent a standardized phenotypic screen to determine the effects of deletion. Additional screens performed:  - In-depth immunological phenotyping - in-depth bone and cartilage phenotyping

References

External links

Further reading